Ana María (17 May 1929 – 6 April 1983) was the nom-de-guerre of Dr. Mélida Anaya Montes, the second in command of the Fuerzas Populares de Liberación Farabundo Martí (FPL), the oldest of the five guerilla organizations making up the FMLN, in El Salvador.

An intellectual, she was considered as an icon among revolutionary women in the region. Eventually she was killed by her own comrades on April 6, 1983, in Managua, Nicaragua.

Later, the FMLN blamed its leader Cayetano Carpio (sometimes referred to as the "Ho Chi Minh of Latin America") as the person responsible for the crime, and he committed suicide. Though he was not in Nicaragua at the time, many believe his stance created a situation that led Ana María's associates to assassinate her.

Early life
She was born in the small town of Santiago Texacuangos, in the central zone of El Salvador. Ana María received her Doctorate of Education from the University of El Salvador, where she became a professor of education and gave classes in the 1960s. She was the assistant director of the Alberto Masferrer University.

In 1965, Anaya Montes founded the National Association of El Salvadorian Teachers (ANDES), also known as 21 de Junio, after its first demonstration in 1965. She led the strikes of educators of 1968 and 1971, which created major trouble for the government of general Fidel Sánchez Hernández.

In 1970, the ex-Secretary General of the Communist Party of El Salvador, Salvador Cayetano Carpio founded the first guerrilla detachment of El Salvador: the People's Liberation Forces Farabundo Martí (FPL).

Death

The murder of Anaya Montes was caused by a deep division that had developed within the FMLN. The majority, led by Ana María, favoured negotiation with the government. The hard line faction opposed any negotiation with the government of El Salvador, and supported a prolonged war. This faction was led by Commander Salvador Cayetano Carpio.

On 6 April 1983, Ana María was murdered at her home in Managua, Nicaragua. Her assassins stabbed her 83 times with an ice pick, and then slashed her neck. Nicaraguan authorities later apprehended the murderers and found them to be members of the FMLN. Rogelio Bazzaglia later confessed to Ana María's murder, stating he was under orders from Carpio, although later retracting it. After her burial and upon hearing the news that Salvador Cayetano Carpio himself was implicated in masterminding Ana María's murder, Carpio committed suicide in his home.

Legacy

Ana María is considered an iconic example for educators and those struggling against oppression, especially in El Salvador. The Melida Anaya Montes Language School in San Salvador, which uses popular education techniques highlights social justice issues, is named for her.

Mélida Anaya Montes Women's Movement (MAM) was created in 1992 to defend women's rights.

See also
 History of El Salvador
 Comandante Clelia

References

Further reading

External links
 FMLN (in Spanish)
 Melida Anaya Montes Language School

1929 births
1983 deaths
People from San Salvador Department
Salvadoran revolutionaries
Salvadoran communists
Women in war in South America
Assassinated Salvadoran politicians
People murdered in Nicaragua
Deaths by stabbing in Nicaragua
People of the Salvadoran Civil War
Salvadoran people murdered abroad
University of El Salvador alumni
Farabundo Martí National Liberation Front politicians
20th-century Salvadoran women politicians
20th-century Salvadoran politicians
Women in warfare post-1945
Female murder victims
1983 crimes in Nicaragua
1983 murders in North America
1980s murders in Nicaragua